Drub is a hamlet in the Kirklees district, in the county of West Yorkshire, England. It is located between Cleckheaton, Birkenshaw, and Gomersal and is considered part of the latter.

References 

Hamlets in West Yorkshire
Geography of Kirklees